"Nolia Clap" is a song by American Southern hip hop trio UTP, released on August 31, 2004 through Rap-A-Lot 4 Life/UTP Records as a lead single from the group's debut studio album The Beginning of the End.... It was written by Terius "Juvenile" Gray, Damon "Wacko" Grison, Clifford "Skip" Nicholas, and producer Donald "XL" Robertson.

The song peaked at number 31 on the Billboard Hot 100 and at number 9 on both Hot R&B/Hip-Hop Songs and Hot Rap Songs charts in the United States.

Its remix version, produced by Sheldon "Slice Tee" Arrington, was also included in The Beginning of the End.... The re-remix version is featured on Nolia Clap (EP) with guest appearances from Z-Ro, Bun B, Earl Hayes (who died 2014), Slim Thug, T.I. and Hot Wright, produced by Donald "XL" Robertson and Juvenile.

The music video was filmed in the Magnolia Projects in New Orleans, Louisiana, and has cameos by B.G., Nelly and Chopper Young City from Da Band.

Charts

Weekly charts

Year-end charts

References

External links

2004 songs
2004 singles
Southern hip hop songs
Juvenile (rapper) songs
Songs written by Juvenile (rapper)